Manuel Castiñeiras Porto (born 7 August 1979) is a Spanish retired footballer who played as a central defender.

Club career
Born in Santiago de Compostela, A Coruña, Castiñeiras' career was mainly associated with local SD Compostela. He represented them in four levels of Spanish football, the highest being Segunda División.

Other than the Galicians, in that tier Castiñeiras also played for SD Eibar, CD Tenerife and Racing de Ferrol, for a total of 138 matches over five seasons. On 30 January 2015, the 35-year-old Compostela captain accepted to retire so that newly-signed Yacine Qasmi could be registered by the Royal Spanish Football Federation; he joined the club's organigram immediately afterwards.

References

External links

1979 births
Living people
Spanish footballers
Footballers from Santiago de Compostela
Association football defenders
Segunda División players
Segunda División B players
Tercera División players
SD Compostela footballers
SD Eibar footballers
CD Tenerife players
Racing de Ferrol footballers